Lia Levonevna Osipian (born January 15, 1930) is an Armenian biologist, plant physiologist, and mycologist.

Career 
Born in the Armenian Soviet Socialist Republic, Osipian studied at Yerevan State University from 1947 to 1952. After graduating, she worked as an assistant and lecturer at the university until she received her doctorate in biological sciences in 1970. She became a professor in the Department of Botany in the Faculty of Botany at Yerevan State University in 1971. Twice, from 1986 to 1990 and 1999 to 2002, she served as the dean of the Faculty of Biology. In 1996, Osipian became a full member of the Armenian National Academy of Sciences and is an Honorary Scientist of Armenia. Over the course of her academic career, she has been the doctoral supervisor for over 20 students.

Legacy 
In 2022, a newly discovered species of fungus from Iran, Sphaerulina osypianiae, was named after her.

References 

Living people
Mycologists
Armenian women scientists
1930 births
Soviet women scientists
Women mycologists
Armenian physiologists
Women physiologists
20th-century Armenian women
21st-century Armenian women
Soviet Armenians
Yerevan State University alumni
Plant physiologists